Jens Christian Andersen (28 June 1929 – 24 April 2010) was a Danish amateur boxer who won a silver medal in the light-middleweight division at the 1951 European Championships, losing in the final to László Papp. He competed in the 1956 Summer Olympics, but was eliminated in the first bout.

References

1929 births
2010 deaths
Boxers at the 1956 Summer Olympics
Olympic boxers of Denmark
Danish male boxers
Middleweight boxers